The A657 is an A road in West Yorkshire, England that begins in Bramley and ends in Saltaire near Shipley.

The road starts from the Bramley Town End (Stanningley By-Pass junction) and ends at the junction with the A650 at Saltaire.

History

Much of the A657 was originally the Shipley and Bramley Turnpike, with toll gates at Windhill Bar, Greengates Bar and Rodley Lane Bar.

In 2010, funding was secured to replace the roundabout at Saltaire (where the A657 ends) by a new traffic light system. The development was completed at the end of 2013, but opinion was divided on whether the change was an improvement.

Places along road 
Bramley
Rodley
Calverley
Greengates
Thackley
Shipley
Saltaire

References

Roads in Yorkshire
Transport in West Yorkshire
Transport in Leeds